The Netherlands competed at the 2009 World Championships in Athletics from 15–23 August. A team of 15 athletes was announced in preparation for the competition. Selected athletes have achieved one of the competition's qualifying standards. The team included 2006 European champion Bram Som and two-time European Indoor medallist Gregory Sedoc.

Team selection

Track and road events

Field and combined events

Results

Men
Track and road events

x= In the first semifinals heat, Bram Som tripped over Abubaker Kaki, who had fallen on his own account. After a protest, Som was allowed to compete in the finals.

Field events

Women
Track and road events

Field and combined events

See also
Netherlands at other World Championships in 2013
 Netherlands at the 2009 UCI Road World Championships

References

External links
Official competition website

Nations at the 2009 World Championships in Athletics
World Championships in Athletics
Netherlands at the World Championships in Athletics